Sir John Hawles (1645–1716), of Lincoln's Inn, was an English lawyer and Whig politician who sat in the English and British House of Commons between 1689 and 1710.

Early life
Hawles was  born in the Close at Salisbury, the second son of Thomas Hawles of Moanton in Wiltshire, and his wife Elizabeth Antrobus of Hampshire, daughter of Thomas Antrobus of Heath House, Petersfield, Hampshire. His father, whose name is sometimes spelled Hollis, belonged to the family of Hawles of Upwimborne, Dorset. During the First English Civil War he was leader of the band known as the club men in Salisbury, who took the side of the parliament.

John Hawles was educated at Winchester College, and matriculated at  Queen's College, Oxford in 1662. He was admitted at  Lincoln's Inn on 10 February 1664, and was called to the bar in 1670.

Career
At the 1689 English general election, the return for Old Sarum was declared void, and Hawles was returned as Member of Parliament for Old Sarum  at the re-election there on 25 March 1689. At the 1690 English general election, he stood for Parliament at  St Ives and Banbury but was unsuccessful at both. In October 1691, he lost out for  the recordership of London against with Sir Bartholomew Showers. On 1 July 1695 Hawles was appointed solicitor-general in succession to Sir Thomas Trevor. At the 1695 English general election, he was returned unopposed as MP for Wilton and was chairman of the committee of privileges and elections from 1695 to January 1696. He was knighted on 28 November 1695. 

At the 1698 English general election, Hawles was returned in a contest for Mitchell, and   unopposed for Bere Alston  but held both seats throughout the Parliament as there were petitions against both returns. He was returned as MP for Truro at a by-election on 4 March 1701, and at the second general election of 1701 was returned in a contest as MP for St Ives. At the 1702 English general election he was returned in a contest as MP for Wilton again, but lost his place as  solicitor-general. He was returned in a contest as Whig MP for Stockbridge at the 1705 English general election and voted for the Court candidate as Speaker on 25 October 1705. At the 1708 British general election, he was returned unopposed as a Whig for Stockbridge. He was passed over for office and may have expressed his resentment by speaking against the Court on the treasons trial bill on 5 April 1709. Nevertheless, he   was appointed as one of the managers of the impeachment of Henry Sacheverell in 1710 but offended his fellow Whigs by giving was on several points. He took no further part in the trial but voted for Sacheverell's impeachment. He was not returned to Parliament at the 1710 British general election, or subsequently.

Later life and legacy
Hawles resided for some years on the family estate at Upwimborne, and died unmarried on 2 August 1716. He left  all his property to  John Johnson of Lincoln's Inn, who may have been an illegitimate son.

References

1645 births
1716 deaths
British MPs 1707–1708
British MPs 1708–1710
Members of Lincoln's Inn
Members of the Parliament of Great Britain for English constituencies
Members of the pre-1707 English Parliament for constituencies in Cornwall
Whig (British political party) MPs for English constituencies
People educated at Winchester College
Solicitors General for England and Wales
English MPs 1689–1690
English MPs 1695–1698
English MPs 1698–1700
English MPs 1701
English MPs 1701–1702
English MPs 1702–1705
English MPs 1705–1707
Members of the Parliament of England for Bere Alston